Mangalorean Bangude Masala is a dish made of cooked mackerel fish served in households and eateries along the Karavalli coastline, in south-western India.  This dish is popular in the coastal districts of Dakshin Kannada and Udupi.  Mackerel is common along the Arabian Sea coastline, and is widely consumed in the states of Kerala, Karnataka, Goa and Maharashtra.  Bangude (ಬಂಗುಡೆ), in Tulu, Konkani, Kannada and in the various dialects spoken along the Konkan/Karavalli coast, means mackerel.

Preparation and Ingredients
Preparing Mangalorean Bangude Masala involves stewing skinned and cleaned mackerel in a thick gravy. Even though the gravies for most seafood dishes consumed along the Arabian Sea coast have generous amounts of grated coconut, the bangude masala gravy does not. The ingredients for the gravy are garlic, coriander, red chilli powder, ginger, onion and tomatoes. However, in coastal Kerala generous amounts of grated coconut is used. The tomatoes give a tangy taste to the dish. Recently, restaurants serving this dish have started using tomato puree and ketchups that are readily available in the market. Freshly chopped coriander leaves are used to garnish this dish.

Traditionally, tamarind was used to impart tanginess to the dish. Another local mackerel based dish of coastal Karnataka, known as Bangude Pulimunchi, is prepared in much the same way as the above-mentioned dish with the addition of tamarind water in pulimunchi. Pulimunch/pulimunchi literally means "a gravy rich in tamarind juice". So it would not be wrong to consider Mangalorean Bangude Masala as a "modern fast food" version of the traditional Bangude Pulimunchi. The recipe follows a blend of dry condiments like red chill, coriander, jeera, mustard, fenugreek seeds, dry roasted with turmeric, ginger, pepper corn

. This is made into paste with tamarind juice or pulp, 3-4 pods of garlic, curry leaves and onion. Later tempered with little oil and curry leaves and the fish added with the curry paste and cooked till done.  It is  traditionally prepared in clay pots which enhances the taste of the curry. Tastes best with red rice.

See also

 South Indian cuisine
 Cuisine of Karnataka

Karnataka cuisine
Desi cuisine
Mangalorean cuisine
Fish dishes